Andrew Reynolds may refer to:

 Andrew Reynolds (archaeologist), English archaeologist
 Andrew Reynolds (political scientist) (born 1967), professor of political science at the University of North Carolina
 Andrew Reynolds (skateboarder) (born 1978), American skateboarder